Jade Etienne (born October 11, 1989 in Regina, Saskatchewan) was a Canadian football wide receiver. In the Canadian Football League’s Amateur Scouting Bureau December rankings, he was ranked as the 15th best player for players eligible in the 2011 CFL Draft. Etienne was drafted fourth overall in the draft by the Winnipeg Blue Bombers and signed a contract with the team on June 1, 2011. He played CIS football with the Saskatchewan Huskies and played high school football at Luther College (Regina, Saskatchewan). He was traded to the Roughriders for quarterback Drew Willy on February 6, 2014. Etienne was released prior to the start of the 2014 CFL regular season.

Professional career 

All statistics taken from Stats Crew

References

1989 births
Living people
Players of Canadian football from Saskatchewan
Canadian football wide receivers
Saskatchewan Huskies football players
Sportspeople from Regina, Saskatchewan
Winnipeg Blue Bombers players
Saskatchewan Roughriders players